Acropoma profundum, Solomon's lanternbelly, is a species of ray-finned fish, a lanternbelly from the family Acropomatidae. It is found in the western South Pacific Ocean in waters near the Solomon Islands.

References

profundum
Taxa named by Makoto Okamoto
Fish described in 2014